David C. Harrington (July 31, 1954 – September 20, 2022) was an American politician from Maryland, a member of the Democratic Party and a former member of the Maryland State Senate. From 2008 to 2022, he served as president and CEO of the Prince George's Chamber of Commerce in addition to serving as a Senior Policy Advisor for Common Health Action. Harrington was a board member of the Eugene and Agnes E. Meyer Foundation, Consumer Health Foundation, Bowie State Board of Visitors and co-lead of the Robert Wood Johnson Place Matters special committee.

Early life
Harrington was born on July 31, 1954, in New York City, New York. He has a B.A. in political science from Howard University. He also received a M.A. from the Miami University in Oxford, Ohio. From 1995 to 2002, Harrington was the Mayor of Bladensburg, Maryland. From 2001 to 2002, he served as president of the Maryland Municipal League. In 2002, he was elected to represent District 5 on Prince George's County Council.

He worked as a senior fellow and faculty member at the James MacGregor Burns Academy of Leadership at the University of Maryland.

In 2006, Harrington ran for reelection to Prince George's County Council. In December 2007, Harrington was elected Council Chair.

In the legislature
Harrington was appointed to the State Senate in 2008 to fill the vacancy created by the death of Gwendolyn T. Britt. While serving in the senate, Harrington was a member of the Education, Health and Environmental Affairs Committee and a member of the Legislative Black Caucus of Maryland.

Harrington ran for reelection to the state senate in 2010 but was defeated.

Family 
Harrington's wife Cheryl is the owner of Shortcake Bakery. His oldest son, Stephen, is an alumnus of Morehouse College and the Brown University Graduate School. David's younger son Christopher is an alumnus of Dickinson College and has an MBA from the Smith School at the University of Maryland.

Harrington died September 20, 2022.

Notes

1954 births
2022 deaths
Democratic Party Maryland state senators
Howard University alumni
Miami University alumni
21st-century American politicians
21st-century African-American people
People from Cheverly, Maryland
Politicians from New York City
County commissioners in Maryland